Cache County School District is a school district located in Cache County, Utah, United States. It serves all the communities within Cache County, except the city of Logan (which is served by Logan City School District). It is one of 41 school districts within the state and 10th largest in terms of student enrollment.

Communities served 
The Cache County School District serves the following communities:

 Amalga
 Avon
 Benson
 Cache (Cache Junction)
 Clarkston
 College Ward
 Cornish
 Cove
 Hyrum
 Lewiston
 Millville
 Nibley
 Newton
 North Logan
 Paradise
 Peter (Petersboro)
 Richmond
 River Heights
 Smithfield
 Trenton
 Wellsville (including Mt. Sterling)

Schools 
The following are schools within the Cache County School District:

Elementary schools 

 Birch Creek Elementary School – Smithfield
 Canyon Elementary School – Hyrum
 Cedar Ridge Elementary School – Hyde Park
 Greenville Elementary School – North Logan
 Heritage Elementary School – Nibley
 Lewiston Elementary School – Lewiston
 Lincoln Elementary School – Hyrum
 Millville Elementary School – Millville
 Mountainside Elementary School – Mendon
 Nibley Elementary School – Nibley
 North Park Elementary School – North Logan
 Providence Elementary School – Providence
 River Heights Elementary School – River Heights
 Summit Elementary School – Smithfield
 Sunrise Elementary School – Smithfield
 Wellsville Elementary School – Wellsville
 White Pine Elementary School -Richmond
Grady's Home school-Peterboro

Middle schools 

 North Cache Middle School – Richmond
 Spring Creek Middle School – Providence
 South Cache Middle School – Hyrum

High schools 

 Green Canyon High School – North Logan: Serving North Logan, Hyde Park, Amalga, Newton, Benson, Clarkston, and Cache Junction.

 Mountain Crest High School – Hyrum: Serving Hyrum, Mendon, Petersboro, Wellsville, Mt. Sterling, Paradise, and Avon.

 Ridgeline High School - Millville: Serving Millville, Nibley, Providence, River Heights, College Ward, and Young Ward.

 Sky View High School – Smithfield: Serving Smithfield, Richmond, Cove, Lewiston, Cornish, and Trenton.

Special schools 

 Cache Alternative High – Logan

See also 

 List of school districts in Utah
 Logan City School District

Notes

References

External links 

 
 

School districts in Utah
Education in Cache County, Utah